Margarites giganteus, common name the giant margarite, is a species of sea snail, a marine gastropod mollusk in the family Margaritidae.

Description
The height of the shell attains 6 mm.

Distribution
This marine species occurs off Novaya Zemlya, Russia.

References

 W. Leche (1878), öfversikt öfver de af Svenska Exp. till N. Semlja och Jenissej 1875 och 1876 insamlade hafsmoll; Sv. Vet. Akad. Handl. Bd, 1878

giganteus
Gastropods described in 1878